Careless Love is an album by jazz singer Madeleine Peyroux that was released in 2004. The songs are cover versions except for "Don't Wait Too Long," which Peyroux wrote with Jesse Harris and Larry Klein.

Track listing

Personnel

Musicians
 Madeleine Peyroux – vocals, acoustic guitar
 Dean Parks – guitars
 Larry Goldings – piano, Wurlitzer electric piano, Estey Organ, Hammond organ, celeste
 David Piltch – double bass
 Jay Bellerose – drums, percussion
 Lee Thornburg – trumpet (tracks 6 and 12)
 Scott Amendola – brushes (track 10)

Technical
 Production coordinator – Cindi Peters
 Design – Steven Jurgensmeyer
 Assistant Engineer – Nicolas Fournier, Ricky Chao
 Mixing – Helik Hadar
 Management – American International Artists
 Mastering – Bernie Grundman
 Photography – Andrew MacNaughtan
 Producer – Larry Klein

Charts

Weekly charts

Year-end charts

Certifications

References

2004 albums
Madeleine Peyroux albums
Albums produced by Larry Klein
Rounder Records albums